The Hunter-Bowen Orogeny was a significant arc accretion event in the Permian and Triassic periods affecting approximately 2,500 km of the Australian continental margin.

The Hunter-Bowen Orogeny occurred in two main phases, a Permian accretion of previously formed passive-marginal Devonian and Carboniferous sediments in the Hunter region and mid-west region of what is now New South Wales, separated by rifting, back-arc volcanism and a later Permian to Triassic event resulting in arc accretion and metamorphism during a subduction event.

The Hunter-Bowen Orogeny has resulted in the New England Fold Belt, a tectonic accretion of metamorphic terranes and mid-crustal granitoid intrusions, flanked by Permian to Triassic sedimentary basins which were formed distally to the now-eroded orogenic mountain belt.

While the Great Dividing Range north of Sydney is a prominent landform, this is more the result of Cenozoic volcanism and crustal uplift since the Jurassic than the result of the original orogenic belt which is essentially mimics. Gravity, magnetics and bathymetry indicate that several slivers of crust formerly from the Hunter-Bowen orogen are now spread out across the Indo-Australian Plate east of the Australian continental landmass, forming some isolated submerged ocean plateaux and islands, notably Lord Howe Rise which includes Lord Howe Island. Lord Howe Rise has a total area of about 1,500,000 square km,

Prior tectonics
The Hunter-Bowen event produced a ~3,000 km long structural foredeep above a Late Carboniferous and Palaeozoic margin to the weakly consolidated Australian continental mass which was part of the Gondwana Supercontinent at this time; the orogen developed to the east of the Palaeozoic Lachlan Orogen and the Proterozoic terranes of the Mount Isa Inlier.

Before the orogeny the rocks of the coastal area were formed.  During Late Carboniferous there was a continental margin with an oceanic trench subducting the ocean floor off the coast.  To the east there was a magmatic arc.  This includes Connors Arch, Auburn Arch, Combarrago Volcanics and the Bathurst Batholith. A forearc basin in between included the Tamworth Belt and Yarrol Belt. Subduction resulted in blueschist metamorphism. At 309 Ma a mid oceanic ridge plate boundary encountered the subduction boundary near Tin Can Bay south of Fraser Island on the North D'Aguilar block.  Another encounter point was near what is now Coffs Harbour.  These ridge encounters with the trench stopped the subduction at those points and resulted in triple junctions moving north and south up the trench, and being replaced by a dextral transform fault.

The northernmost triple junction, a ridge-trench-fault junction moved up the Queensland coast at 28 mm per year.  As it moved the magmatism inland stopped and it reached Townsville about 290 Ma.  The paired triple junction with this, a fault-trench-fault junction, moved south from Brisbane at about 12 mm per year.  The triple junctions in the New England region stopped subduction very quickly because the mid ocean ridge was almost parallel to the trench.  The merger converted the trench to a transform fault and turned off the volcanoes to the west. In between these two ridge trench encounter points, a small triangular shaped plate continued to subduct between Brisbane and Coffs Harbour.  More time was available to build up a wide subduction complex.

Megafold
The Texas-Coffs Harbour megafold resulted from dextral motion (clockwise) along a major fault in eastern Queensland.  The hypothetical fault, which is not exposed at the surface was called Gogango-Baryulgil fault zone.  500 km southerly displacement of the coastal terrane which stretches from Coffs Harbour in the south to Broad Sound near St Lawrence, Queensland in the north, brought it into its current position relative to the rest of Australia, and formed a major structural fold inland from Coffs Harbour.  The movement may have been caused by absorption of lateral motion between the northern pair of triple junctions.  The megafold formed around 290 Ma (early Permian) and took from 10 to 20 million years.

Around this terrane some areas of extension happened on the main craton, creating several basins up to 2 km deep.  The Texas region is one such sedimentary basin.

Around 280 Ma in the early Permian, the relative oceanic plate movement changed direction and the  continental margin again became convergent.  This may be due to far distant continental collisions in the buildup of Pangea.  Volcanoes appeared in central Queensland forming the Lizzie Creek Volcanics and the Camboon Volcanics.  Extension in these formed the Grantleight Trough, an intra-arc rift.  The subduction zone was in a line with the north-east coast of Queensland, with a back arc basin formed to the east of the Hunter region, called the Barnard Basin.  Deposition continued in basins around 270 Ma into the Permian, but volcanic activity was reduced.

The Sydney-Gunnedah-Bowen Basin

This structural foredeep filled with marine deepwater sediments and later fluviatile sandstones, which during the Permian and Triassic formed vast accumulations of coal. The Sydney and Bowen Basins were flanked by an offshore island arc system during continued accretion and subduction during the Permian.

Thrusting of the Permian sequences westward in a Rocky Mountains style foreland basin system continued as metamorphism began affecting the lower parts of the offshore island arcs, composed primarily of Devonian marine sediments of continental origin, and Carboniferous flysch. Metamorphism resulted in the generation of S-type and I-type granites which intruded this Palaeozoic sedimentary sequence in the New England Fold Belt. To the north, significant thin-skinned deformation affected the Carboniferous Marlborough and Yarrol Terranes, resulting in magmatism and restricted granite emplacement.

The subduction zone was curved in an arc resulting in compression in the west-southwest east-northeast direction as well as sinistral shear in the New England district.  A continental fragment may have collided with the area, pushing off the Hastings Block and fracturing the Barnard Basin.

The results of the Hunter-Bowen event were:
 Deformation
Metamorphism of both greenschist and rare blueschist facies
thrusting
 Transtension pull-apart basins such as the 
Esk Trough, a thin pull-apart rift infill fluvial coal-bearing basin
Clarence Moreton Basin, including the Ipswich Basin
 Transpressional faulting and widespread deformation
 Arc volcanism, namely in the Gympie province, offshore of the Hunter valley and Sydney Basin
 Back-arc basin formation, 
Gunnedah Basin
Sydney basin
Bowen Basin
 Granite emplacement 
 New England I-type and S-type suites during accretion (330-260Ma)
 Gympie M-type and I-type suites in back-arc position (4 suites; 260-245; 240-235, 231-225 and 220-215Ma)
 Andesite, rhyolite and basalt volcanism in the 
 In-arc at the Permo-Triassic boundary 
 Back-arc in the early to mid Triassic
 Gold, tin, tungsten mineralisation in the Gympie Block, the New England orogen and throughout the Queensland hinterlands
 Coal formation in the Sydney basin, Esk Trough, Gunnedah Basin, Bowen Basin and Ipswich Basin

Geochronology
Geochronology has identified several episodes of deformation, accretion, subduction and magmatism.

Gympie Block
 Deformation occurred at 250-240 Ma 
 Tholeiitic suite of magmatism, including M-type and I-type granites at ~250-245 Ma
 Transitional tholeiitic to calc-alkaline granite and andesite suite ~245-240 Ma
 I-type granite suite and basalt suite ~229 Ma associated with gold mineralisation
 Late I-type and S-type high-level caldera complexes 225-221 Ma

See also
 Geology of Australia
 Orogeny
 Subduction zone
 Shear (geology)

References

Orogenies of Australia
Geology of New South Wales
Permian orogenies
Triassic orogenies